Gemini Studios was an Indian film studio based in Madras, Tamil Nadu. It was launched when S. S. Vasan, a businessman of many ventures (including the ownership of Ananda Vikatan) bought Motion Picture Producers' Combines from Krishnaswamy Subrahmanyam and renamed it. The studio re-opened under the name Gemini. Despite the common beliefs about a lucky racehorse or the astrological sign of his wife, it was the logo Vasan chose that led to the name. Subrahmanyam had shown him a picture of his very young boys, blowing on toy trumpets in the nude. Vasan chose the pose to craft the logo and hence the name Gemini—The Twins. The new facade also had statues of ‘The Gemini Twins’, blowing the bugle. Gemini Studios served as a breeding ground for innumerable artists and technicians for the south Indian Film Industry. The Gemini twins became a household symbol and the Gemini flyover was named after the original studio at that junction. Gemini Studios is one of the few producers in Tamil cinema to survive beyond 100 productions along with AVM, Modern Theatres, Thenandal Films, etc.

A chapter called "Poets and Pancakes" is based upon Gemini studios which is an excerpt from a novel My years with the Boss by Asokamitran is in the english curriculum of Class 12th Flamingo textbook by NCERT.

Early history 
S.S.Vasan bought from his friend K. Subramanyam a Film distribution business Motion Picture Producers' Combines studio on Mount Road for Rs.86,427-11-9,the odd figure arrived at through including the interest on unpaid wages of the employees and it was renamed as Gemini Studios in the year 1940. G. Kamble, a painter from Kolhapur worked at the studios in his early life.

Time line 
 1941 – Madanakamarajan with the arrival of K. Ramnoth, a cameraman and scenarist, and A.K. Sekhar, art director brought many changes in production.
 1942 – Jeevana Mukthi is their first film in Telugu language remake of Bhaktha Chetha (1940) of K. Subramanyam.
 1942 – Nandanar A Tamil film starring M. M. Dandapani Desikar and Serukalathur Sama
 1943 – Mangamma Sapatham
 1945 – Kannamma En Kadhali
 1944 – Dasi Aparanji
 1947 – Miss Malini
 1948 – Kalpana. This was Uday Shankar's dance spectacular, shot at the studio, that set the trend for future choreographers.
1948 – Chandralekha a magnificent movie by S. S. Vasan that was a first for a Tamil to achieve All India distribution and brought excellent returns.
 1949 – Apoorva Sahodarargal A `costume adventure` film in three languages – Tamil, Telugu, Hindi, and a major success.
 1952 – Moondru Pillaigal – Tamil. Made also in Telugu as Mugguru Kodukulu
 1953 – Avvaiyyar - A Tamil film that proved a major box-office hit.
 1954 - Rajee En Kanmani - Bilingual Film. Telugu Films title Rajee Naa Pranam
 1955 – Insaniyat -A Hindi film starring Dilip Kumar and Dev Anand.
 1958 – Vanjikottai Valiban and Raj Tilak – A Tamil and Hindi film starring Gemini Ganesan, Vyjayanthimala and Padmini.
 1959 – Paigham – A Hindi film starring Dilip Kumar, Vyjayanthimala and Raaj Kumar.
 1965 – Vaazhkai Padagu – A Tamil film starring Gemini Ganesan, Devika
 1966 – Motor Sundaram Pillai – This was Sivaji Ganesan's sole film for Gemini Studios. After S.S. Vasan's death, his son S.S. Balasubramanyam took the reins.
 1968-- Oli Vilakku- MGR Film with ss vasan
 1969 – Manushulu Marali – A Telugu film starring Shoban Babu.
 1970 – Samaj Ko Badal Dalo – A Hindi film starring Parikshit Sahni, Sharada, Prem Chopra and Pran.
 1971 – Irulum Oliyum – A Tamil film starring A. V. M. Rajan, Vanisri
 1975 – Ellorum Nallavare'' – This was a flop and the studio's fortunes declined in the 70s and it was taken over by Anand Cine Services later.

Aftermath
After the studio being abandoned for two decades, the buildings were razed and a luxury hotel called The Park was constructed and opened in 2002.

References

External links 
 Gemini Studio Official Website

Film distributors of India
Film production companies of India
Film production companies based in Chennai
Indian film studios
Mass media companies established in 1940
Indian companies established in 1940
Indian companies disestablished in 1975
Mass media companies disestablished in 1975